Michael Richard Beschloss (born November 30, 1955) is an American historian specializing in the United States presidency. He is the author of nine books on the presidency.

Early life
Beschloss was born in Chicago, grew up in Flossmoor, Illinois, and was educated at Eaglebrook School, Phillips Academy (Andover, MA), Williams College and Harvard University. He majored in political science, working under James MacGregor Burns at Williams, from which he graduated with Highest Honors, and earned an MBA at Harvard Business School, with the original intention of writing history while serving as a foundation executive.

Career
Beschloss has been a frequent commentator on the PBS NewsHour and is the NBC News Presidential Historian. He is a trustee of the White House Historical Association and the National Archives Foundation and he also sits on the board of the Smithsonian's National Museum of American History. He has been a trustee of the Thomas Jefferson Foundation (Monticello), the Urban Institute, the University of Virginia's Miller Center of Public Affairs and the PEN/Faulkner Foundation. He also sat on the advisory board to the Abraham Lincoln Bicentennial Commission and was a member of the President's Commission on White House Fellowships. He has held appointments in history at the Smithsonian Institution, as a Senior Associate Member at St. Antony's College (University of Oxford), a visiting scholar at the Harvard University Russian Research Center, a Senior Fellow of the Annenberg Foundation, and a Montgomery Fellow and Dorsett Fellow at Dartmouth College. Since 2014, he has been chair of the annual Robert F. Kennedy Book Awards.

Beschloss has appeared on The Daily Show in 2003, 2005, 2006, 2007, and 2010. He was portrayed by Chris Kattan on NBC's Saturday Night Live on February 14, 1998.

He started a Twitter account, @BeschlossDC, in October 2012. It appears on Time magazine's list of "Best Twitter Feeds of 2013". He also has contributed columns on history under the title HistorySource to The New York Times.

Beschloss is also the editor of Washington by Meg Greenfield (2001) and Essays in Honor of James MacGregor Burns (with Thomas Cronin) (1988).

Awards
Beschloss received a 2005 News & Documentary Emmy Award for the Discovery Channel's Decisions That Shook the World, of which he was the host; the category was "Outstanding Individual Achievement in a Craft: Research". He has also received the Williams College Bicentennial Medal, the State of Illinois's Order of Lincoln (the State's Highest Honor), the Harry S. Truman Public Service Award, the Ambassador Book Award, the Rutgers University Living History Award, the New York State Archives History Award, the Founders Award of the Historical Society of Pennsylvania and the Andover Alumni Award of Distinction. He has received honorary doctorates from Lafayette College, Williams College, St. Mary's College of Maryland, Saint Peter's College, Governors State University and Allegheny College.

Michael Beschloss was inducted as a Laureate of The Lincoln Academy of Illinois and awarded the Order of Lincoln (the State’s highest honor) by the Governor of Illinois in 2004 in the area of Communications and Education.  In October 2022, with a ceremony at the National Archives in Washington DC, Beschloss received the National Archives' annual Records of Achievement Award.

In 2019, Beschloss received The Lincoln Forum's Richard Nelson Current Award of Achievement.

Personal life 
Beschloss has two sons with his Iranian-born wife Afsaneh Mashayekhi Beschloss. His wife is president and CEO of the Rock Creek Group, a Washington, D.C. investment firm, former treasurer and chief investment officer of the World Bank, a past trustee of the Ford Foundation, PBS and the Colonial Williamsburg Foundation and a current trustee of the Rockefeller Foundation, the World Resources Institute and the Institute for Advanced Study. Their son Dr. Alexander Beschloss (born 1994), is a graduate of the University of Pennsylvania School of Medicine. Their son Cyrus Beschloss (born 1996) is a graduate of Stanford Journalism School and the founder of The Generation Lab, which surveys and analyzes young people aged 18 to 34.  The couple are advisory board members of Resources for Inner City Children. Beschloss and his wife were guests of President and Mrs. Clinton at the White House dinner for British Prime Minister Tony Blair on February 5, 1998. They also attended the Clinton White House dinner celebrating the 200th anniversary of the White House on November 9, 2000. They were guests of President George W. Bush and First Lady Laura Bush at the White House dinner for Charles, Prince of Wales and Camilla, Duchess of Cornwall on November 2, 2005.

Bibliography
 Kennedy and Roosevelt: The Uneasy Alliance (1980); started as Beschloss's senior honors thesis at Williams College
 Mayday: Eisenhower, Khrushchev and the U-2 Affair (1986)
 Eisenhower: A Centennial Life (1990)
 The Crisis Years: Kennedy and Khrushchev, 1960–1963 (1991)
 The Conquerors: Roosevelt, Truman and the Destruction of Hitler's Germany, 1941–1945 (2002)
 Presidential Courage: Brave Leaders and How They Changed America, 1789–1989 (2007)
 Presidents of War: The Epic Story, from 1807 to Modern Times (2018)

Co-authored Books
 At the Highest Levels: The Inside Story of the End of the Cold War (1993); with Strobe Talbott.

Edited Books
 Taking Charge: The Johnson White House Tapes, 1963–1964 (1997)
 Reaching for Glory: Lyndon Johnson's Secret White House Tapes, 1964–1965 (2001),
Edited transcriptions of Lyndon B. Johnson's conversations, as captured by his taping system, with historical annotation and commentary. A third Johnson volume is forthcoming.
 Jacqueline Kennedy: Historic Conversations on Life with John F. Kennedy (2011)

Reception

President Bill Clinton told People in December 1997 that the first audiobook he ever listened to was Taking Charge by Michael Beschloss. In Bob Woodward's Plan of Attack, President George W. Bush is quoted as telling the author Elie Wiesel in February 2003, "I read your views on Auschwitz in Michael Beschloss' book", referring to The Conquerors. Bush also refers to Beschloss' book Presidential Courage in his 2010 memoir Decision Points.

John Frankenheimer's last film, Path to War (HBO, 2002), starring Donald Sutherland and Michael Gambon, was based in part on Beschloss' two books on Lyndon B. Johnson.

References

External links

 
 Michael Beschloss on The Daily Show with Jon Stewart, May 9, 2007
 
 
 Booknotes: Interview with Beschloss on The Crisis Years: Kennedy and Khrushchev, 1960–1963, July 14, 1991
 C-SPAN, In Depth: Interview with Beschloss, September 2, 2012

1955 births
20th-century American historians
American male non-fiction writers
21st-century American historians
21st-century American male writers
Cold War historians
Harvard Business School alumni
Historians from Illinois
Historians of the United States
Living people
NBC News people
PBS people
Phillips Academy alumni
People from Flossmoor, Illinois
United States presidential history
Williams College alumni
Writers from Chicago
20th-century American male writers